

The Airconcept VoWi-10 is a German two-seat ultralight monoplane designed by Helmut Wilden.

Design and development
The single-seat prototype high-wing braced monoplane was built by Wilden and first flew 16 April 1975. Due to the interest raised by the prototype Wilden set about re-designing the type as a two-seater that would be capable of series production or in kit form for homebuilders. A new company  Airconcept Flugzeug und Gerätebau GmbH was formed to produce and market the type. The prototype production two-seater first flew in 1978.

Specifications

References
http://www.airconcept-enterprises.com/

Notes

Bibliography

1970s German civil utility aircraft
1970s German ultralight aircraft
High-wing aircraft
Aircraft first flown in 1975